Adeline Billington (3 January 182623 January 1917), was an English actress and teacher.

Biography
Adeline Mortimer was born 3 January 1826, in England. She married John Billington, a fellow actor. Billington made her London debut in Cupid and Psyche at the Adelphi Theatre. She worked in that theatre for 16 years. She often worked with her husband. Billington was popular with Charles Dickens for several of her performances in the theatrical performances of his works. Billington was friends with Vaughan Williams as well. Billington also worked as an acting teacher, knowns as Mother of the stage.

Sources

1826 births
1917 deaths
19th-century English actresses